In the run up to the 2017 Austrian legislative election, various organisations carried out opinion polling to gauge voting intention in Austria. Results of such polls are displayed in this article.

The date range for these opinion polls are from the previous legislative election, held on 29 September 2013, until the legislative election on 15 October 2017.

Graphical summary

Poll results 
Poll results are listed in the tables below in reverse chronological order, showing the most recent first, and using the date the survey's fieldwork was done, as opposed to the date of publication. If that date is unknown, the date of publication is given instead. The highest percentage figure in each polling survey is displayed in bold, and the background shaded in the leading party's colour. In the instance that there is a tie, then all applicable figures are shaded. The lead column on the right shows the percentage-point difference between the two parties with the highest figures.

2017

2016 and earlier

Hypothetical polls with Kurz as ÖVP leader

See also 
Opinion polling for the Austrian presidential election, 2016

Notes

External links 
List of past Austrian opinion polls 

2017